Queen Meresankh III was the daughter of Hetepheres II and Prince Kawab and a granddaughter of the Egyptian pharaoh Khufu. She was the wife of King Khafre.

Hetepheres also provided her daughter with a black granite sarcophagus decorated with palace facades for Meresankh's burial.

Her tomb was discovered by archeologist George Reisner on April 23, 1927, with subsequent excavations undertaken by his team on behalf of Harvard University and the Museum of Fine Arts, Boston.

Her sarcophagus and skeleton are today located in the Cairo Museum; the latter reveals that she was 1.54 metres (5'1") tall and between 50–55 years at her death. An anthropological study suggested, that she might have suffered from bilateral silent sinus syndrome.

The tomb also contained a set of the earliest known canopic jars. A limestone statue depicting Queen Hetepheres embracing her late daughter Meresankh was found in her tomb and is today located in the Museum of Fine Arts in Boston.

Meresankh III's children
The children of Meresankh and Khafre include:
 Prince Nebemakhet Buried in Mastaba 8172. His titles include scribe of the (divine) book, elder of the snwt-house of his father, chief justice and vizier, hereditary prince, king's son of his body, chief lector-priest, khet-priest of the Great One, khet-priest of (?) Temp. Khephren to Menkaure or a little later. In the mastaba Duaenre, and Niuserre are mentioned. As well as a brother named Ankhemre. Nebemakhet's wife was named Nubhotep, Prophetess of Hathor Mistress-of-the-Sycamore in all her places, etc.
 Prince Duaenre Mastaba G5110 Vizier of Menkaure. Possibly the father of vizier Babaef.
 Prince Kenterka. Mentioned in Meresankh's tomb. Khenterka is assumed by some to be a son of Meresankh III.
 Prince Niuserre (A) (Ny-user-Re-ankh (?) is mentioned in Meresankh's tomb) King's son of his body, Chief lector-priest of his father, Treasurer of the King of Lower Egypt, etc. Middle to end of Dyn. IV. (Unfinished Rock cut tomb in central field)
 Prince Ankhemre King's son of his body. Mentioned in the inner chapel of his brother Nebemakhet.
 Princess Shepsetkau (mentioned in Nebemakhet's Mastaba).

References

External links
Virtual exploration of the mastaba of Meresankh III

Queens consort of the Fourth Dynasty of Egypt
26th-century BC women
25th-century BC women
Khafre